A by-election for the seat of Blain in the Northern Territory Legislative Assembly was held on 31 July 1999. The by-election was triggered by the resignation of Country Liberal Party (CLP) member Barry Coulter, a former Deputy Chief Minister. Coulter had held Blain, and its predecessors Berrimah and Palmerston, since 1983.

The CLP selected Terry Mills, a private school Principal, as its candidate. The Labor candidate was Nicole Cridland.

Results

References

1999 elections in Australia
Northern Territory by-elections
1990s in the Northern Territory